HSN, formerly Home Shopping Network, is an American television network.

HSN may also refer to:
Hasan Abdal railway station, in Pakistan
Hereditary sensory neuropathy, a medical condition that inhibits sensation
Health Sciences North, a hospital in Sudbury, Ontario, Canada
Xiang Chinese, a variety of the Chinese language
Zhoushan Putuoshan Airport in Zhoushan, Zhejiang, China
Hammerskin Nation, a white supremacist group